Calaphidini is a bug tribe in the subfamily Calaphidinae.

Genera

Subtribe: Calaphidina
Betacallis -
Betulaphis - 
Boernerina -
Calaphis -
Callipterinella -
Cepegillettea -
Clethrobius -
Euceraphis -
Hannabura -
Neobetulaphis -
Oestlundiella -
Symydobius -
Taoia -

Subtribe: Monaphidina
Crypturaphis -
Latgerina -
Monaphis -
Platyaphis -

References

External links 

Calaphidinae
Hemiptera tribes